Can Özüpek (born 2 February 1996) is a Turkish triple jumper.

He finished fifth at the 2017 European U23 Championships, twelfth at the 2018 European Championships and fourth at the 2019 Summer Universiade. He also competed at the 2019 European Indoor Championships without reaching the final.

His personal best jump is 16.77 metres, achieved in July 2018 in Bursa.

References

1996 births
Living people
Turkish male triple jumpers
Competitors at the 2019 Summer Universiade